Stonewall Columbus is a nonprofit organization serving the lesbian, gay, bisexual, transgender, and queer (LGBTQ) population of Columbus, Ohio. The organization is located in the Short North district of Columbus.

Established in 1981, Stonewall Columbus is the organizer of the annual Columbus Pride.

The organization operates the Stonewall Columbus Community Center, a  building in the Short North. The community center was funded with $3.8 million in donations and opened in 2019. It expanded upon their previous center, known as the Center on High.

History
Stonewall Columbus was founded as Stonewall Union in 1981. It held its first pride parade in 1982, following a small parade in 1981.

In 2017, a controversy arose when four protesters were arrested during a Stonewall Columbus pride parade. The protesters were blocking the parade from proceeding, and protesting Stonewall's lack of intersectionality and the large volume of police at the event. The protesters, known as the Black Pride 4, ignored police orders to clear the street and were then arrested. Three of the protesters were sentenced to community service and probation. The controversy prompted a dispute over Stonewall Columbus's view of racial minorities. Amid calls for the organization's director to step down, the pride festival coordinator resigned, admitting the group is unsympathetic to gay and transgender people of color. Stonewall's director retired the following year. Also in 2018, Black Queer & Intersectional Collective hosted Columbus Community Pride, as an alternative to Stonewall Columbus's event, on the same day. The group hired a black, trans-owned security company to monitor their festival, and refused any corporate sponsors.

See also

List of LGBT-related organizations and conferences
List of LGBT community centers

References

External links
 
 Columbus Pride

Organizations based in Columbus, Ohio
LGBT community centers in the United States

LGBT in Ohio
Non-profit organizations based in Ohio
Organizations established in 1981
High Street (Columbus, Ohio)